Joseph Harold Goddard (born July 23, 1950) is a retired American Major League Baseball catcher who played with the San Diego Padres in .

External links

1950 births
Living people
Alexandria Aces players
Amarillo Gold Sox players
Baseball players from West Virginia
Hawaii Islanders players
Major League Baseball catchers
Marshall Thundering Herd baseball players
Sportspeople from Beckley, West Virginia
San Diego Padres players
Tri-City Padres players